Eastern Refinery Model High School is a secondary school in Patenga Thana of Chittagong, Bangladesh. The school was established at 1974.

References

Schools in Chittagong
High schools in Bangladesh
1974 establishments in Bangladesh
Educational institutions established in 1974